Poecilasthena urarcha is a moth in the family Geometridae. It is found in Australia, including Tasmania.

References

Moths described in 1891
Poecilasthena
Moths of Australia